Golden Swallow may refer to:

Golden swallow (bird)
Golden Swallow (1968 film), a 1968 film by Shaw Brothers
Golden Swallow, a 1987 film directed by O Sing-pui; see List of Hong Kong films of 1987